Following is a list of transfers of the 2009 Paraguayan Primera División season.  The División Profesional de la Asociación Paraguaya de Fútbol, also known as the Primera División, or due to sponsorship reasons Copa TIGO, is the top-flight professional football league in Paraguay. There are 12 teams in the first division.

Cerro Porteño
In:
  Jorge Daniel Núñez from  Club Nacional (Paraguay)
  Ivan Gonzalez Ferreira from  Sol de America
  Julio Dos Santos from  Atletico Paranaense
  Jaison Ibarrola from  Universidad Católica
  Carlos Recalde from  Argentinos Juniors
  Roberto Nanni from  Vélez Sársfield

Out:
  Germán Castillo from  Gimnasia y Esgrima de Jujuy
  Alcides Piccoli to  Gimnasia y Esgrima de Jujuy
  Roberto Junior Fernandez to  Estudiantes de la Plata
  Jonni Cabrera to  Udinese
  Walter Fretes to  Sportivo Luqueño
  Carlos Villagra to  Sportivo Luqueño
  Alfredo Rojas to  Club Nacional (Paraguay)

Olimpia
In:
 Claudio Vargas &  Daniel Ferreira from  Sportivo Luqueño
 Carlos Bonet from  Cruz Azul
 Nelson Romero from  Club Libertad
 Pablo Giménez from  Querétaro FC
 Nelson Cuevas from  Universidad de Chile

Out:
Denis Caniza out to  Club Nacional

Transfers
2009
Paraguay